Sit. Stay. Love. is a 2021 Australian Christmas romantic comedy film, directed by Tori Garrett, written by Holly Hester and starring Georgia Flood, Ezekiel Simat, Anthony Phelan, Anna McGahan,  Christine Amor and Kaushik Das. The film was shot during COVID-19 pandemic. The film was released in Australia theatrically on December 2, 2021.  Lifetime acquired the film's United States distribution rights, and then aired it on the Lifetime channel on November 11, 2022 under the new title The Dog Days of Christmas.

Plot
Aid worker Annie Blake (Georgia Flood) teams with her old school nemesis Dylan (Ezekiel Simat) to save the local animal shelter and find homes for the animals.

References

External links
 
 Official page from The Steve Jaggi Company
 United States official site

2021 films
Australian romantic comedy films
2021 romantic comedy films
2020s English-language films
Lifetime (TV network) films